Alison Gibson (born July 9, 1999 in Houston, Texas) is a diver from the United States.

College career
In 2017, Gibson was NCAA diving champion.

International career
Gibson qualified for the 2020 Olympics in the women's synchronized 3 metre springboard with partner Krysta Palmer by virtue of winning the U.S. Olympic Trials in part to their high degree of difficulty in their dives.

References

American female divers
Living people
1999 births
Sportspeople from Houston
Divers at the 2020 Summer Olympics
Olympic divers of the United States
Texas Longhorns women's divers
21st-century American women